Nekromanteia is a Big Finish Productions audio drama based on the long-running British science fiction television series Doctor Who.

Plot
The Fifth Doctor, Peri and Erimem attempt to discover the secret of the domain of the dead.

Cast
The Doctor — Peter Davison
Peri — Nicola Bryant
Erimem — Caroline Morris
Tallis — Kate Brown
Jal Dor Kal — Gilly Cohen
Wendle Marr — Ivor Danvers
Yal Rom — Nigel Fairs
Salaysian — Andrew Fettes
Cmmdr Harlon — Glyn Owen
Thesanius — Gary Russell
Lt Cochrane — Kerry Skinner
Paul Addison — Simon Williams

Reception

Nekromanteia was met with almost universally negative reviews. Particular criticism was directed at the depiction of Harlon's attempted rape of Peri, and him facing no consequences for this act in the course of the story. Peter Davison was reportedly so unhappy with the story that he requested that Austen Atkinson never write for Big Finish again.

External links
Big Finish Productions – Nekromanteia

2003 audio plays
Fifth Doctor audio plays